Agha in Iran,  may refer to:
 Agha, Kermanshah
 Agha, Lorestan
 Agha, Razavi Khorasan